Bury Metropolitan Borough Council is the local authority of the Metropolitan Borough of Bury in Greater Manchester, England. It is a metropolitan district council, one of ten in Greater Manchester and one of 36 in the metropolitan counties of England. It provides the majority of local government services in Bury.

Parliamentary representation 
Bury is currently covered by two constituencies: Bury North (nine wards) and Bury South (eight wards).

Wards and councillors 
Each ward is represented by three councillors.

See also
Bury local elections

References

External links

Metropolitan district councils of England
Local authorities in Greater Manchester
Leader and cabinet executives
Local education authorities in England
Billing authorities in England
1974 establishments in England
Metropolitan Borough of Bury